Shay Carl Butler (born March 5, 1980), known professionally as Shay Carl, is an American YouTube personality. He has three YouTube channels, two of which ("shaycarl" and "SHAYTARDS") have over three million subscribers.  Butler and Corey Vidal developed a documentary called Vlogumentary on a $200,000+ budget that was funded with an Indiegogo campaign and raised by mostly from his viewers. Vlogumentary was released on April 20, 2016. Forbes called Butler one of the "most successful video entrepreneurs on YouTube" and in 2011 The New York Times featured Butler's production company Maker Studios.

Early life 
Shay Carl Butler was born on March 5, 1980, in Logan, Utah, to Carl and Laurie Butler. Butler is the oldest of four children. His siblings Casey, Carlie, and Logan are all active in the YouTube community. Casey Butler (caseylavere) is married to Kayli Butler (HeyKayli) and Carlie Wood (CarlieStylez and WhatsUpWoods) each have over 500,000 subscribers on their YouTube channels, while Logan Butler (LoganMckay55) has just under 400,000. At the age of four, Butler's family moved to Phoenix, Arizona, and subsequently to Pocatello, Idaho. After graduating from Highland High School, Butler served a full-time, two year mission in Barbados, Trinidad and Guyana for the Church of Jesus Christ of Latter-day Saints. He briefly attended Idaho State University, but dropped out to start working on his own. Prior to appearing on YouTube, Butler installed  granite countertops for a living and worked as a school bus driver. He also worked as a radio DJ for Z103.

YouTube popularity 
Butler became more popular on YouTube after Philip DeFranco watched one of his videos and gave him a shout-out. The shout-out resulted in a rise of Butler's subscribers and a friendship with DeFranco. By working with other YouTubers at The Station, Butler more than quadrupled his subscribers. Butler later joined the YouTube Partner Program and co-founded Maker Studios. In November 2009, he collaborated with Midi Mafia to create a flash mob at Planet Hollywood in Las Vegas. In 2009, Butler's "SHAYTARDS" channel won "Best YouTube Channel or Personality" at Mashable's 3rd annual Open Web Awards. In 2013, the same channel was one of the nominees in the "Best Non-Fiction or Reality Series" category of the 3rd Streamy Awards. Butler and his wife, Colette, run a podcast called "When the Kids Go to Sleep", where they interview YouTubers and celebrities such as Terry Crews and Bas Rutten. In February 2013, actor Matt Damon made a guest appearance in one of Butler's vlogs after he and Damon had collaborated on a video to promote a Water.org project. Butler sometimes creates sponsored videos, in which he promotes brands or companies in exchange for financial benefits, including with General Electric, Foot Locker, Kia and Skype.

In 2014 the Shay Carl YouTube channel was listed on New Media Rockstars Top 100 Channels, ranked at #31.

In late 2015, Shay, along with his 12-year-old son Gavin, wrote a lifestyle, self-help book, Fat Dad, Fat Kid.

On September 28, 2016, Butler announced that he would suspend the Shaytards YouTube channel for one year on March 5, 2017, which was the date of his 37th birthday.

On February 12, 2017, Butler announced he would be leaving YouTube for the time being. In his announcement on his Twitter page, Butler said that due to alcoholism, his "purpose is to rehab". International Business Times ran a story about Carl allegedly exchanging sexual messages through Twitter with an adult webcam model named Aria Nina. The Shaytards channel became active again in March 2018 with a video where Shay and his wife Colette talk about their relationship and the YouTube channel, and the family announced they would start uploading videos again, but would "take it one day at a time" and not commit to a daily vlog schedule. In the following videos, Shay has been openly talking about going to addiction meetings and working on his and Colette's relationship.

Butler has a chapter giving advice in Tim Ferriss' book Tools of Titans.

Personal life 
Butler married Colette Crofts ("Colette Kati") in January 2003. The couple have five children: Gavin, Avia, Emmi, Brock and Daxton. His family is known as the "Shaytards" and as "YouTube's first family". Butler stated that much of his children's lives have been recorded and distributed in public. Butler's son, Brock, has been noted as the internet's "first Truman baby" as his life has been documented since birth. His daughter, Emmi, was featured on the front cover of James Blunt's album Some Kind of Trouble. Butler's other daughter, Avia, released the song "Forever Love" on June 12, 2014.

In 2014, Butler bought a property extending 1000-acres in Pocatello, Idaho.  In 2016, he purchased the nearby Pebble Creek Ski Area in Inkom, Idaho.

Butler lost 112 lbs (50.8 kg) in the space of a year and subsequently ran three marathons, one of which he ran with motivational speaker Dave Ramsey, with whom he is good friends. Butler documented his weight loss journey on his "ShayLoss" channel.

YouTube channels 
Butler has two YouTube channels. His "shaycarl" and "SHAYTARDS"  channels have over one million and five million subscribers, respectively. For his "shaycarl" channel, Butler frequently works with celebrities such as retired basketball player Charles Barkley and retired mixed martial artist Bas Rutten.

Involvement with Maker Studios 
Butler originally moved out to Los Angeles in 2009 to form the company Maker Studios, along with friends and fellow YouTubers Lisa and Ben Donovan, Dan Zappin, Philip DeFranco and Kassem Gharaibeh. Maker's programming is divided into four networks: "Men", "Women", "Family", and "Entertainment".
These four networks include  "The Mom's View", which Butler's wife Colette appears on regularly as a part of the weekly "Mom's View Talk Show". Maker Studios was sold to The Walt Disney Company for $500 million on March 24, 2014. During its 25th season, America's Funniest Home Videos, whose YouTube channels are being managed by Maker Studios since January 2014, will promote its brand via two web series, one of which will be created by Butler.

Awards and nominations 
Awards
 2009 Mashable  Open Web Awards  Best YouTube Channel or Personality: SHAYTARDS
 2014 4th Streamy Awards ICON award (entrepreneurship category)
Nominations
 2013 3rd Streamy Awards  Best Non-Fiction or Reality Series: SHAYTARDS

Filmography 
 2009 The Station  (web series; 5 episodes) as Randy and Shay
 2010 The Annoying Orange (web series; 2 episodes)  as Cabbage (voice) and Shay Red
 2011 No Ordinary Family (TV series; 1 episode) as Security Guard
 2012–2013  MyMusic (web series; 3 episodes)  as Hipster Metal
 2015–2016 Wonder Quest (web series) (13 episodes) as Heinous (voice)
 2016 Studio C (TV series; 1 episode) as Johnny "The Vlogfather"

Butler has also done voice acting work for Cartoonium's Shaybeard online cartoon series, which features Butler as a Viking. He also co-starred  in a public service announcement of the Adopt the Arts Foundation.

See also 
 List of YouTubers
 Maker Studios

References

External links 
 
 
 
 

1980 births
American Internet celebrities
Latter Day Saints from Idaho
Living people
Video bloggers
Maker Studios people
American Mormon missionaries
20th-century Mormon missionaries
Idaho State University alumni
Latter Day Saints from Utah
Latter Day Saints from Arizona
Latter Day Saints from California
Mormon missionaries in Barbados
Mormon missionaries in Trinidad and Tobago
Mormon missionaries in Guyana